Buck Ramsay (born ) is a Canadian male weightlifter, competing in the 94 kg category and representing Canada at international competitions. He participated at the 2010 Commonwealth Games in the 94 kg event.

Major competitions

References

1982 births
Living people
Canadian male weightlifters
Weightlifters at the 2010 Commonwealth Games
Commonwealth Games competitors for Canada
Place of birth missing (living people)
Weightlifters at the 2007 Pan American Games
Pan American Games competitors for Canada
20th-century Canadian people
21st-century Canadian people